Ava Luna is an American indie rock band from Brooklyn, New York, United States.

Reviews 
Ice Level was reviewed in Pitchfork by Paul Thompson who says "The genre-bending New York synth-funk septet create a glorious mess on their full-length debut.". The songs from Electric Balloon "stick in your head in a way their earlier material didn't" according to Lindsay Zoladz from Pitchfork. Tess Duncan of Pitchfork said of Infinite House that "The album has a loose, playful energy, and always seems to be ready to pounce on you."

Members
Current 
Carlos Hernandez – vocals, guitar (2005–present)
Julian Fader – drums (2005–2007, 2010–present)
Felicia Douglass – keyboard, vocals (2008–present)
Ethan Bassford – bass (2010–present)

Former 
Judnick Mayard – vocals (2008–2009)
Alex Smith – drums (2007–2010)
Siheun Song – vocals (2007–2010)
Nathan Tompkins – keyboard (2005–2013)
Becca Kauffman – keyboard, vocals, guitar (2009–2019)

Discography

Albums 
Lemming (2007, self-released)
 Ice Level (2012, Infinite Best)
 Electric Balloon (2014, Western Vinyl)
 Infinite House (2015, Western Vinyl)
Histoire de Melody Nelson (2018, Turntable Kitchen)
Moon 2 (2018, Western Vinyl)
Live at Market Hotel (2020, Western Vinyl)

Compilations 
 Takamatsu Station (2015, self-released)

EPs 
 3rd Avenue Island (2009, Cooling Pie Records)
 Services EP (2010, Cooling Pie Records/Environmental Aesthetics)
 Pigments EP (2019, Western Vinyl)

Singles 
 Wrenning Day (2012, Inflated Records)
 Water Duct (2012, Weathervane Music)
 Rain Flexi (2015, Father/Daughter Records)
 Israelites Flexi (2015, Joyful Noise Recordings)

References

External links
 

Musical groups from Brooklyn
Musical groups established in 2009
Western Vinyl artists